The Slovak Association of American Football (SAAF) is the governing body of American football in Slovakia. It takes part in the organization of all the competitions related to the Slovak Championship. SAAF is responsible for the expansion and popularization of the sport. In Slovakia, American football is played under the 7v7, 11v11 and flag football variants.

History 
The SAAF was formed in the year 2010 by the fusion of the SZAF and SAAF. In 2013, the SAAF became a member of the IFAF. The current president of the association is Ivan Labuda (since January 2014). Until 2013, the SAAF had 9 members:

 Bratislava Monarchs (founded in 1996)
 Nitra Knights (founded in 1997)
 Zvolen Patriots (founded in 2006)
 Trnava Bulldogs (founded in 2007)
 Topoľčany Kings (founded in 2009)
 Smolenice Eagles (founded in 2009)
 Žilina Warriors (founded in 2010)
 Banská Bystrica Daemons (founded in 2009)
 Cassovia Steelers (founded in 2011)

Slovak Football League 7v7  
7v7 is a reduced variant of the original game played with 7 players instead of 11, with just a few adjustments to the original NCAAF rules. The so-called "Little League" has been played so far during the spring season (April–July). However, from the 2014 season, this league will be played during the fall.

Slovak Champion 7v7  
 2010 (SZAF)-Zvolen Patriots
 2011-Bratislava Monarchs
 2012-Bratislava Monarchs
 2013-Smolenice Eagles

Slovak Football League 11v11  
11v11 is classic American Football based on IFAF rules (NCAA rules). The Slovak 11v11 League was played during the 2011 and 2012 seasons. During the 2013 and 2014 the league will not take place. Due to the small number of teams able to provide an 11-man full roster, these ones are moving into international competitions.

Slovak Champions 11v11  
 2010 (SZAF)-Zvolen Patriots
 2011-Bratislava Monarchs
 2012-Bratislava Monarchs

Slovak Flag Football League  
Flag football is a 5-man variation of the non-contact sport based on American football; it is to be played during the early spring season in 2014.

National team
The national team is under the scope of the SAAF. Up to 2013 it had played 3 games, with an average attendance of around 3000 people.

Statistics 
First game
  24:14  (Prague, 8 August 2010)

Further games
   24:30  (Nitra, 16 September 2012, 3000 spectators)
   6:38  (Bratislava, 18 August 2013, 3000 spectators)

References

Further reading
 American football in Slovakia

External links 

Sports organizations established in 2010
American Football
American football governing bodies in Europe
 
2010 establishments in Slovakia